Sverige, det bästa på vår jord (Swedish for 'Sweden, the best on our earth'.) is a song written by Sebastian Fronda, Mikael Clauss and Thomas Thörnholm. The song won an Aftonbladet early 2008 Internet contest, applying for the Team Sweden fight song for the 2008 UEFA European Football Championship in Austria and Switzerland. The song was recorded by Markoolio and was released as a single on 5 May 2008. It also appeared on his 2008 studio album, called Jag är konst. The song peaked at number one on the Swedish Singles Chart.

Charts

References 

2008 singles
Markoolio songs
Number-one singles in Sweden
Sweden national football team songs
Swedish-language songs
Sweden at UEFA Euro 2008
2008 songs
Songs written by Thomas Thörnholm
2008 in Swedish football